Pakistan Sangeet Icon is a reality-based first singing competition shown on MTV Pakistan and Indus TV. It is based on the popular British show Pop Idol and its American counterpart American Idol. The show aims to find the most talented young singer in Pakistan.

The show begins with a cross-country tour in which aspiring singers audition in front of three judges, namely Ali Haider, Mekaal Hasan and Pappu (all recording artists) under the supervision of Creative Director Mujtaba Lakhiya Syed Safdar Ali and team Yasir Siddiqui, . Eventually the number of performers is narrowed down with each competitor performing live. Viewers have two hours following the broadcast of the show to phone or text in their votes for their favorite competitor. On the following week, the competitor with the fewest votes is eliminated. Syed Ali Asad Zaidi was the Runner-up of the show.

The two remaining finalists battle it out during the finale and viewers have more time allotted to vote. The next day, the competitor with the most votes is declared the winner and is awarded One Crore Rupees.

Pakistan Sangeet Icon 1
The winner of the first competition was Asad Abbas. Then he sang for a live singing show called "Yeh Shaam Mastani" Executive Producer of Ali Fareed & Producer/Director "Mujtaba Lakhiya & Safdar Ali" where he got a lot of appreciation from  audiences around the world. Asad later joined Mekaal Hasan Band in mid-2010. Shahid Mehmood has the biggest collection of Asad Abbas performances on its YouTube channel. You can also watch Pakistan Sangeet Icon Season One on the same YouTube channel, launched Pakistan Sangeet Icon Season II under the supervision of Ali Fareed.

Pakistan Sangeet Icon 2
After the success of Pakistan Sangeet Icon Season I, Indus TV Network took another step to success and launched Pakistan Sangeet Icon Season II under Executive Producer Ali Fareed and Producer/Director "Mujtaba Lakhiya & Safdar Ali." The judges Panel consisted of three super stars and brilliant musicians of Pakistan, Faakhir Mehmood, Shehzad Roy and Emu (from Fuzön). The show started with auditions all over Pakistan and after tough selections, the judges selected 12 contestants. The winner of the second season of Pakistan Sangeet icon was Ather Sani from Karachi.

References

External links
Pakistan Sangeet Icon - official website
http://www.apnicommunity.com
https://www.youtube.com/chshahid2k/ Pakistan Sangeet Icon Season One full with All Performances Available

Singing talent shows
Pakistani television series
Pakistani music television series
Idols (franchise)
Pakistani reality television series